Emerald Township is one of the twelve townships of Paulding County, Ohio, United States.  The 2000 census found 824 people in the township.

Geography
Located in the northern part of the county, it borders the following townships:
Delaware Township, Defiance County - north
Defiance Township, Defiance County - northeast
Auglaize Township - east
Jackson Township - south
Paulding Township - southwest corner
Crane Township - west
Mark Township, Defiance County - northwest corner

No municipalities are located in Emerald Township.

Name and history
It is the only Emerald Township statewide.

Government

The township is governed by a three-member board of trustees, who are elected in November of odd-numbered years to a four-year term beginning on the following January 1. Two are elected in the year after the presidential election and one is elected in the year before it. There is also an elected township fiscal officer, who serves a four-year term beginning on April 1 of the year after the election, which is held in November of the year before the presidential election. Vacancies in the fiscal officership or on the board of trustees are filled by the remaining trustees.

References

External links
County website

Townships in Paulding County, Ohio
Townships in Ohio